Ravenea lakatra is a species of flowering plant in the Arecaceae family. It is a palm endemic to Madagascar. It is threatened by habitat loss and overcollection. There are probably fewer than 30 mature plants remaining in the wild.

References

lakatra
Endemic flora of Madagascar
Critically endangered flora of Africa
Taxonomy articles created by Polbot
Taxa named by Henri Lucien Jumelle
Taxa named by Henk Jaap Beentje